The Hongqi E-HS9 is an electric full-size luxury SUV made by Hongqi.

Overview
Originally previewed by the Hongqi E115 Concept during the 2019 International Motor Show Germany (IAA) and 2019 Guangzhou Auto Show, the production Hongqi E-HS9 was first shown at the 2020 Beijing Auto Show.

The production Hongqi E-HS9 is a 5 door, 7 seat vehicle, and costs $80,000 to $110,000.

The E-HS9 features a dual-color design and comes with 22-inch wheels. It has a dimensions of 5209 mm/2010 mm/1731 mm, with a 3110 mm wheelbase.

Technology
The Hongqi E-HS9 is equipped with an intelligent sensor steering wheel and six smart screens, capable of functions such as AR real scene navigation and remote vehicle control by mobile phone, including unlocking, temperature regulation, smart voice control, and vehicle locating. The Hongqi E-HS9 is equipped with the L3+ autonomous driving system and OTA.

Performance
The E-HS9 is available in two different performance variants. The lower-spec model features one electric motor for each axle rated at  each, with  combined.

Battery and Charging
The E-HS9 has a 92.5-kilowatt-hour battery unit with 108 kW CCS-plug. The car supports wireless charging technology or non-contact charging, which can fully charge the vehicle in 8.4 hours. The E-HS9 vehicle battery is specially designed with the fully-covered side battery protection structure. The vehicle can autonomously park itself and adjust air suspension height for the best wireless charging alignment with charging efficiency up to 91%.

See also
Hongqi
Hongqi H9

References

Cars introduced in 2020
Cars of China
Luxury sport utility vehicles
E-HS9
Production electric cars
Flagship vehicles
Full-size vehicles
All-wheel-drive vehicles